This is a list of current and former Roman Catholic churches in the Roman Catholic Diocese of Lansing. The Lansing diocese includes three of Michigan's largest cities (Lansing, Ann Arbor, and Flint) and covers 10 counties as follows: Clinton, Eaton, Genesee, Hillsdale, Ingham, Jackson, Lenawee, Livingston, Shiawassee and Washtenaw.

The cathedral church of the diocese is the Gothic Revival St. Mary Cathedral, built in 1913 in Lansing.

Ann Arbor

Brighton

Clinton

Flint

Howell

Jackson

Lansing

Other areas

References

 
Lansing